Elsa Lára Arnardóttir (born 30 December 1975) is an Icelandic politician for the Progressive Party. From 2013 to 2017, she served as a member of the Althing for the Northwest constituency.

References

1975 births
Living people
Elsa Lara Arnardottir
Elsa Lara Arnardottir
Elsa Lara Arnardottir
Elsa Lara Arnardottir